Baru is a small village in the Bap block of the Jodhpur district of the Indian state Rajasthan. The village is officially named "Baroo" but people unofficially designate it with the name "Baru."

History 
The village has some half a dozen deep wells and a temple with idol of the deity(or kuladevi) named "(Khinwanj mata(mother)", suggesting the ancient footprints of the village.

Economy 
The village's economy is founded on the agriculture. 

The farmers here usually grows :

 Mustard
 Wheat
 Pearl millet(Bajra)
 Cumin
 Psyllium(Isabgol)
Arugula(Taramira)
Ricinus(Arandi)

The economy is further spun around this agricultural enterprise and people buy & sell seeds, pesticides, tractors and other agricultural equipment.

References 

Villages in Jodhpur district